Wayne Grigsby (born 1947) is a Canadian screenwriter and producer, mainly for television.

Career 
Grigsby, who comes from Calgary, Alberta, started primarily in arts and entertainment journalism. His goal had always been to write fiction. He had a script produced by Brian McKenna and Bernie Zukerman, which led to his becoming a screenwriter. Later, he formed Big Motion Pictures Inc. with David MacLeod. He also tried American TV with a failed pilot starring Kelly McGillis.

Awards 
2004 Margaret Collier Award

Partial filmography

Producer 
 North of 60 (1992; TV series)
 Dark Eyes (1995; TV series)
 Black Harbour (1996, TV series)
 A Guy and a Girl (2002; TV series)
 Snakes & Ladders (2004; TV series)
 Sex Traffic (2004; two-part miniseries)
 October 1970 (2006; eight-part miniseries)

Writer 
 And Then You Die (1987)
 Task Force: Caviar (2000)
 Trudeau (2002) 
 Trudeau II: Maverick in the Making (2005)

References 

Canadian television producers
Canadian television writers
Living people
1947 births
Writers from Calgary
Canadian male television writers
Canadian male screenwriters